Kim Young (born February 4, 1955) is an American professional golfer.

Young played several years on the PGA Tour and its developmental tour, the Ben Hogan Tour/Nike Tour (now Web.com Tour), from 1977 to 1994. On The PGA Tour (1977–78, 1988, 1991–93), his best finish was T-4 at the 1988 Deposit Guaranty Golf Classic. On the Ben Hogan/Nike Tour (1990, 1994), his best finish was a win at the 1990 Ben Hogan Dakota Dunes Open. His tournament golf career was cut short after he lost the vision in his right eye in 1995.

Young tried unsuccessfully to qualify for the Champions Tour in 2005, 2008, and 2010. He did qualify and play in for the U.S. Senior Open in 2008 and 2009.

Young is a director of golf at Twin Rivers Golf Club in Oviedo, Florida and also is a golf instructor.

Professional wins (1)

Ben Hogan Tour wins (1)

See also
1987 PGA Tour Qualifying School graduates
1990 PGA Tour Qualifying School graduates
1991 PGA Tour Qualifying School graduates
1992 PGA Tour Qualifying School graduates

References

External links

American male golfers
PGA Tour golfers
Golfers from Texas
Golfers from Orlando, Florida
People from Harlingen, Texas
1955 births
Living people